Monroe Furnace is a national historic district and historic iron furnace located at Barree Township in Huntingdon County, Pennsylvania. It consists of one contributing site and one contributing structure. They are the remains of the furnace stack, its immediate surroundings, and the visible foundation remains of 14 workers' houses. The furnace was established in 1846–1847 by General James Irvin. It was in operation until 1863 and is included in the Pennsylvania State University Experimental Forest.

It was listed on the National Register of Historic Places in 1989.

References

Industrial buildings and structures on the National Register of Historic Places in Pennsylvania
Historic districts on the National Register of Historic Places in Pennsylvania
Industrial buildings completed in 1847
Buildings and structures in Huntingdon County, Pennsylvania
1847 establishments in Pennsylvania
Industrial furnaces
National Register of Historic Places in Huntingdon County, Pennsylvania